The Big Canyon is a stretch of the Quesnel River in the Cariboo Country of the Central Interior of British Columbia, Canada, near the city of the same name.

See also
Little Canyon (Quesnel)

References

Canyons and gorges of British Columbia
Landforms of the Cariboo